Deushevo (Däweş) is a rural locality (a selo) in Kurtlykulsky Selsoviet, Karaidelsky District, Bashkortostan, Russia. The population was 210 as of 2010. There are 6 streets.

Geography 
Deushevo is located 43 km southwest of Karaidel (the district's administrative centre) by road. Kurtlykul is the nearest rural locality.

References 

Rural localities in Karaidelsky District